Amine Kamoun (born 16 September 1982) is a Tunisian footballer who currently plays centre-back for the club CS M'saken.

Career

Indonesia
On his Bintang Medan debut in 2011, Kamoun asked coach Michael Feichtenbeiner to allow him to be the free-kick taker. At first, Feichtenbeiner express dubiety on the Tunisian's free-kick ability but allowed him to take the shot, scoring the team's only goal in a narrow 1-0 win over Atjeh United.

Despite being seen as Bintang Medan's most consistent defender, he was also known for his susceptibility to injuries and the club sought to find a replacement for him by June 2011.

Received a hamstring injury when his club hosted Jakarta FC 1928 in the Liga Primer Indonesia.

Tunisia
Under duress from angry fans after a 1-1 stalemate with Grombalia Sports, Kamoun announced his early retirement from football in 2013 but returned shortly.

References

1982 births
Living people
Association football defenders
Expatriate footballers in Indonesia
Tunisian footballers
Tunisian expatriate footballers
Tunisian Ligue Professionnelle 1 players
AS Marsa players
EGS Gafsa players
CS Hammam-Lif players
US Monastir (football) players
Stade Gabèsien players
Stade Sportif Sfaxien players
CS M'saken players